Zorro (also known as The New Zorro, New World Zorro, and Zorro 1990) is an American action-adventure drama series featuring Duncan Regehr as the character of Zorro. Regehr portrayed the fearless Spanish hero and fencer on The Family Channel from 1990 to 1993. The series was shot entirely in Madrid, Spain and produced by New World Television (U.S.), The Family Channel (U.S.), Ellipse Programme of Canal Plus (France), Beta TV (Germany), and RAI (Italy). 88 episodes of the series were produced, Raymond Austin directed 55 episodes and produced 37. There were 10 more  episodes made than the first Zorro television series, which was produced by Disney in the late 1950s.

Since 2011, the series is airing in the United States on Retro Television Network as The New Zorro. Sony Pictures is the distributor for this version of Zorro.

Synopsis 
The series is set in early 19th-century Spanish California. When the commandant of Los Angeles, Alcalde Luis Ramone, terrorizes the people of the pueblo and oppresses them, Don Alejandro de la Vega summons home from Spain his son Diego to fight the alcalde and his men. When Diego arrives, he finds his town in a sorry state, and while pretending to have little interest in anything but books and his experiments, he creates the secret identity of El Zorro: The Fox. He and his mute servant, the teenage Felipe, battle the alcalde's tyranny.

Cast and characters

Main 
 Duncan Regehr as Don Diego de la Vega / Zorro
 Patrice Martinez as Victoria Escalante (credited as "Patrice Camhi" Seasons 1–2)
Juan Diego Botto as Felipe
 James Victor as Sgt. Jaime Mendoza
 Michael Tylo as Alcalde Luis Ramone (Seasons 1–2)
 J. G. Hertzler as Alcalde Ignacio de Soto (Seasons 3–4)
 Efrem Zimbalist Jr. as Don Alejandro de la Vega (Season 1)
 Henry Darrow as Don Alejandro de la Vega (Seasons 2–4)
 Tabare Carballo as Sepulveda (Seasons 3–4) (Cpl. in Season 3 / Pvt. in Season 4)

Guest stars 

A
 Adam West
 André the Giant
B
 Bernard Kay
 Benito Martinez
 Ben Miles
D
 Daniel Craig
 Doug McClure
 Dougray Scott

F
 Faith Brook
G
 Garfield Morgan
H
 Hilton McRae
 Hunter Tylo
J
 James Horan
 Jesse Ventura
 Jim Carter
 John Hallam
 Julie T. Wallace
K
 Kevin Brophy
M
 Michael Culver

N
 Nicholas Clay
 Nigel Terry
O
 Oliver Haden
 Oliver Cotton
 Omri Katz
P
 Patrick Drury
 Patsy Rowlands
 Peter Guinness
 Peter Diamond
 Pete Postlethwaite
 Philip Michael Thomas
R
 Robert Hoy
 Roger Lloyd-Pack
 Roddy Piper
S
 Soon-Tek Oh

T
 Terry Richards
 Timothy Bateson
 Tim Reid
V
 Valentine Pelka
 Vernon Dobtcheff
 Vincenzo Nicoli
W
 Warwick Davis

Episodes

Production 
Out of the 88 produced episodes director Raymond Austin directed 55 and directed and produced 37. He also camera operated 83 episodes.

The title sequence of the first episode differs from the one used in the rest of the series. The rest of the episodes' openings use the same opening theme, but different clips, and the song is performed by Cathi Campo (Rosemary Clooney's niece), rather than a male singer.

Patrice Martinez is credited as "Patrice Camhi" in the first two seasons of the series. She was married to producer-director Daniel Camhi during that time. (He did not work on this series.)

Zorro's horse is usually named Tornado, but in this series he has been renamed Toronado. The bridle and breastplate worn by Toronado in this series are identical to the one worn by Zorro's horse in the Alain Delon film Zorro (1975) and by Chico, the Queen's horse, in the syndicated television series Queen of Swords (2000-2001).

Both this series and Queen of Swords were filmed in Spain. Zorro was shot at studios outside of Madrid in 1990, and filming for Queen of Swords took place at the Texas Hollywood Studios in Southern Spain in 2000.

Henry Darrow is the first? Latino actor to play the role of Zorro's father on television.

(Armando Joseph Catalano, aka Guy Williams, who portrayed the character in Disney's series, was Sicilian). He was the first actor to work in three different Zorro television series. He was the voice of Zorro in the animated series The New Adventures of Zorro (1981), and played the older Zorro in the short-lived CBS series Zorro and Son (1983) and Zorro's father in this series.

The original pilot (as included in the DVD boxed set Zorro: The Complete Series) focuses on a young man named Antonio de la Cruz, played by Patrick James, who is told by a mortally wounded Don Diego de la Vega to take on the mantle of Zorro. In this pilot Felipe is able to speak. Only Patrice Martinez albeit as a different character survived to the actual series. The pilot was filmed at Texas Hollywood.

Music 
The Complete Zorro Soundtrack was released in 2012.  It includes 25 tracks composed by Jay Asher and is available in CD and MP3 formats.

Release

VHS 
Two tapes of episodes from this series were released to the United States home video market in 1996.  The first tape contains Parts 1–4 of "The Legend Begins" from the first season (which originally aired as a made-for-cable movie based on the series, and was released on VHS in that format), and the second tape contains the final four episodes of the series under the name A Conspiracy of Blood.  Each tape's four episodes are presented as a 90-minute movie, with at least one scene in each movie that is not in the regular episodes.

DVD 
Two separate DVD boxed sets are available in France. The episodes are dubbed in French and subtitled.

In 2009, the German company Kinowelt Home Entertainment released the complete first season of the series, dubbed in German.

The entire series is available on DVD in Region 1. In this set, the unique opening theme used in the series premiere is replaced by Campo's version, which was used in the rest of the series. Also, some of the episodes use the abbreviated version of the opening credits that appeared in reruns on The Family Channel. "The Legend Begins" is included in its episodic version, rather than as the expanded movie that was originally aired and later released on VHS. Other episodes that originally aired as one hour specials ("The Devil's Fortress" and "One for All") are split in to separate episodes (as they were for reruns) on the DVD set.

References

External links 
 Zorro Productions, Inc.
 
 
 Zorro on Hulu.com
 New World Zorro (fan site)
 Series intro

1990 American television series debuts
1993 American television series endings
1990s American drama television series
English-language television shows
Television shows set in Los Angeles
The Family Channel (American TV network, founded 1990) original programming
1990s Western (genre) television series
Zorro television series
Television series by New World Television
Television shows filmed in Spain
Films based on works by Johnston McCulley